The sport climbing events  at the 2005 World Games in Duisburg was played between 22 and 23 July. 32 athletes, from 14 nations, participated in the tournament. The competition took place in Landschaftspark Nord.

Participating nations

Medal table

Events

Men

Women

References

External links
 International Federation of Sport Climbing
 Sport climbing on IWGA website
 Results

 
2005 World Games
2005